The 1977 Mexico City WCT was a men's tennis tournament played on indoor carpet courts in Mexico City, Mexico. The event was part of the 1977 World Championship Tennis circuit. It was the second edition of the tournament and was held from 8 March until 13 February 1977. Unseeded Ilie Năstase won the singles title.

Finals

Singles
 Ilie Năstase defeated  Wojciech Fibak, 4–6, 6–2, 7–6
 It was Năstase' 1st singles title of the year and the 55th of his career.

Doubles
 Wojciech Fibak /  Tom Okker defeated  Ilie Năstase /  Adriano Panatta, 6–2, 6–3

See also
 1977 Monterrey WCT

References

External links
 ITF tournament edition details

Mexico City 
Mex
Mexico City WCT